Midget is the first novel by British author Tim Bowler, first published in 1994. It is a psychic and psychological thriller. It is set in Leigh-on-Sea.

Plot
Teenage Midget is abnormally small and can barely speak. He has fits as a result of the secret abuse he suffers at the hands of his psychopathic older brother, Seb, who is to outward appearances utterly devoted. Midget dreams of buying a boat and sailing away, but people say it'll take a miracle for that to happen. Midget knows miracles can happen, but sometimes they hurt people who get in the way.

Reception
The Sunday Telegraph described Midget as "a masterly handling of suspense and cold, trickling horror."

References

External links
Tim Bowler
The wraith – a potent motif in Tim Bowler’s early work

1994 British novels
British young adult novels
Novels by Tim Bowler
Novels set in Essex
1994 debut novels
Southend-on-Sea (district)
Oxford University Press books